"Bastille Day" is a song by the Canadian rock band Rush, and is the opening track from their third album, Caress of Steel. Like most Rush songs, the music was written by Geddy Lee and Alex Lifeson, and the lyrics by Neil Peart. The song uses the storming of the Bastille, which began the French Revolution, as an allegory for revolutionary fervor needed in the struggle against tyrannical government.

"Bastille Day" was played as the opening number at Rush's concerts for several years following its release. Live versions of the song appear on the albums All the World's a Stage and Different Stages. The last time it was performed live was in 1981, but an instrumental section was played during the R30 Tour as part of the "R30 Overture," which opened concerts on that tour.

Progressive metal band Dream Theater, originally known as "Majesty," took their original name from founding drummer Mike Portnoy's description of the ending of "Bastille Day" as "majestic."

Personnel
Geddy Lee — vocals, bass
Alex Lifeson — guitar
Neil Peart — drums

See also
List of Rush songs

References

Rush (band) songs
1975 songs
Songs written by Alex Lifeson
Songs written by Geddy Lee
Song recordings produced by Terry Brown (record producer)
Songs written by Neil Peart
Songs based on actual events
Heavy metal songs
Progressive metal songs